Live Tour 2013: Japonesque (stylized as KODA KUMI LIVE TOUR 2013 ~JAPONESQUE~) is the twelfth live video by Japanese singer-songwriter Koda Kumi. It was released in DVD (2 discs) and Blu-ray formats on 4 December 2013.

The first press of both version has included a cardboard calendar and stand calendar for fanclub members only.

Information
Live Tour 2013 ~Japonesque~ is Japanese singer-songwriter Kumi Koda's twelfth concert DVD. While it debuted at No. 1 on the Oricon Live charts, it dropped to No. 2 for the weekly ranking; it remained on the charts for over two months.

The DVD was released in 2DVD format, with the second DVD containing bonus footage, which included behind-the-scenes of the tour and the background videos used for some of the songs performed. The concert DVD was also released on Blu-ray. This made it her first live tour to be released in the Blu-ray format.

The first press editions also included a cardboard slipcase, while a standing calendar was included for fan club members.

Track list
(Source)

DVD1
<Opening Movie>
"So Nice feat. Mr. Blistah"
"D.D.D."
"Jounetsu"
"Ai o Tomenaide"
"Sayonara no Mukougawa"
"KO-SO-KO-SO"
"V.I.P feat. T-Pain"
"Pink Spider"
"Escalate"
"Slow feat. Omarion"
"Dance Part I"
"Black Cherry Introduction 
"Juicy (Remix)
"Hot Stuff feat. KM-MARKIT (Remix)
"Taboo"
"Dance Part II"
"Is This Trap?"
"Alone"
"Koishikute"
"darling" (Acoustic Ver.)
"Ai no Uta" (Acoustic Ver.)
"Brave"
"In The Air"
"Boom Boom Boys"
"Bling Bling Bling"
"No Man's Land"
"Outside Fishbowl"
"Freaky"
"Selfish"
"Love Me Back"
"Be My Baby"
"Poppin' love cocktail feat. TEEDA"Encore
"Lady Go!"
"Cutie Honey"
"Lovely"
"Shake Hip!"
"LALALALALA"
"All for you"
"walk ~to the future~"Double Encore
"LALALALALA"

DVD2
"Bonus Movie"
"Koda Kumi Live Tour 2013 ~Japonesque~ Making"
"Koda Kumi Live Tour 2013 ~Japonesque~ Interlude Movie"

Show dates

References

2013 video albums
Koda Kumi video albums
Live video albums
Albums recorded at Saitama Super Arena
Albums recorded at the Yokohama Arena